Paul Kilderry and Sandon Stolle were the defending champions but lost in the quarterfinals to Tommy Haas and Max Mirnyi.

Bob Bryan and Mike Bryan won in the final 7–5, 7–6(8–6) against Jan-Michael Gambill and Andy Roddick.

Seeds

  Bob Bryan /  Mike Bryan (champions)
  Wayne Black /  Kevin Ullyett (first round)
  Justin Gimelstob /  Alex O'Brien (semifinals)
  Paul Kilderry /  Sandon Stolle (quarterfinals)

Draw

External links
 2001 Mercedes-Benz Cup Doubles draw

Los Angeles Open (tennis)
2001 ATP Tour